The General Insurance Association of Korea (Korean: 손해보험협회, GIAK formerly Korea Non-Life Insurance Association) is a non-profit trade association representing the general (non-life) insurance industry of Korea. Its main purpose is to foster sound development of the general insurance industry and to uphold the rights and interests of its members as well as the insurance policyholders. Its headquarters is located in Jongno-gu, Seoul, Korea.

History 
The GIAK was established in 1946 as "Chosun Non-Life Insurance Association". In 1948, it was officially incorporated as "Korean Non-Life Insurance Association". In 2007, its name was changed to that of today.

Goals and activities 

The GIAK's stated goals for service to the public include:

 Improve systems concerning general insurance
 Participate in insurance-related international bodies
 Disclose the business performances of the member companies
 Promote traffic safety campaigns
 Management of insurance solicitors

The organization also operates services for consumer protection and advocacy, including an insurance consumer counseling center. The counseling center enlists insurance experts and attorneys to provide advice and handle consumer complaints. The center provides these services online, via a telephone call center, in person at their offices and through a mobile counseling center.

Another goal is to decrease insurance fraud by educating involved governmental and healthcare industry bodies. One example of their pursuit of this goal was the Gwangju Regional Insurance Crimes Citizens' Joint Workshop, which was a conference focused on decreasing the high rate of health insurance crimes in Gwangju. As part of this conference, the organization presented awards to police and healthcare workers who actively prevented insurance fraud, including one Gwangju police officer who arrested 164 people involved in fraud.

The GIAK also works alongside government agencies to facilitate communication with insurance companies during disaster events. For example, in the 2018 typhoon season, the organization provided assistance to the Ministry of Public Safety and Security by facilitating communication with vehicle insurance companies. If a parking area were flooded, the ministry or local governments could report vehicle numbers to the GIAK, who would manage communication with insurance companies. In some cases, vehicles in parking areas with a high flood risk could be moved to safer locations.

Member Companies

Meritz Fire & Marine Insurance
Hanwha General Insurance
Lotte Insurance
MG Non-Life Insurance
Heungkuk Fire & Marine Insurance
Samsung Fire & Marine Insurance
Hyundai Marine & Fire Insurance
KB Insurance
DB Insurance
Korean Reinsurance Company (Korean Re)
Seoul Guarantee Insurance
Axa General Insurance
AIG Korea
The-K Non-Life Insurance
Nonghyup Property & Casualty Insurance
BNP Paribas Cardif General Insurance
ACE American Insurance Company

References

External links
General Insurance Association of Korea Homepage  (Korean and English)

Financial services companies established in 1946
Insurance companies of South Korea
Finance in South Korea